The Roman Catholic Diocese of Sunyani is a diocese located in the city of Sunyani in the Ecclesiastical province of Kumasi in Ghana.

History
 March 1, 1973: Established as Diocese of Sunyani from the Diocese of Kumasi

Special churches
The Cathedral is Christ the King Cathedral in Sunyani.

Bishops
 Bishops of Sunyani (Roman rite)
 Bishop James Kwadwo Owusu (1973.03.01 – 2001.12.28)
 Bishop Matthew Kwasi Gyamfi (since 2003.04.14)

Other priests of this diocese who became bishops
Peter Kwaku Atuahene, appointed Bishop of Goaso in 1997
Dominic Nyarko Yeboah, appointed Bishop of Techiman in 2007

See also
Roman Catholicism in Ghana

References
 GCatholic.org
 Catholic Hierarchy

Sunyani
Sunyani
Sunyani
Roman Catholic dioceses and prelatures established in the 20th century
1973 establishments in Ghana
Roman Catholic Ecclesiastical Province of Kumasi